Jan Reichle is an Australian cinematographer whose credits include the feature film Jucy (2010). He studied at Victorian College of the Arts School of Film and Television.

References

External links
Personal website

Australian cinematographers
Living people
Year of birth missing (living people)
Place of birth missing (living people)